Legislative elections were held in South Korea on 26 November 1963. They were the first held after the 1961 coup and subsequent approval of a new constitution the previous December, which inaugurated the Third Republic.

The result was a victory for the Democratic Republican Party of coup leader Park Chung-hee, which won 110 of the 175 seats in the National Assembly. Voter turnout was 72.1%.

Results

By city/province

References

Legislative elections in South Korea
1963 elections in South Korea